VinUni (formally VinUniversity) is a private and nonprofit university located in Hanoi, Vietnam. VinUni was established by the private corporate Vingroup following the approval by the Prime Minister of Vietnam in March 2018. According to VinUni, its inaugural class of the academic year 2020-2021 will consist of about 300 students, whereas its full capacity would be at around 3500 students.

History
In November 2017, Vingroup began its collaboration with the Cornell SC Johnson College of Business of Cornell University in order to explore the development of a new private university in Vietnam aiming at QS 5-star rating standard. According to Cornell, it would be in charge of the creation of the initial leadership and faculty for VinUni from its own faculty members, as well as the examination and validation of the quality of curricula developed by VinUni. Expanding this initiative, in April 2018 Vingroup signed a strategic collaboration and strategic alliance with Cornell and another Ivy League member - University of Pennsylvania, which agreed with supporting the VinUniversity Project with the development of its undergraduate and graduate medical training programs. A year later, dean of external relations at the SC Johnson College of Business Professor Rohit Verma was appointed to be the founding provost of VinUni in April 2018.

Along with the creation of strategic partnership with Cornell and UPenn, Vingroup also proceeded with the administrative and physical foundations for the VinUni Project by successfully applying for an approvals of establishment and operation by the Government of Vietnam in March 2018 and December 2019 respectively, and beginning the construction of the VinUni campus in November 2018. On 15 January 2020, this main campus of VinUniversity was officially inaugurated at the Opening Ceremony with the presence of the Deputy Prime Minister Vũ Đức Đam and Minister of Education and Training Phùng Xuân Nhạ.

Campus
VinUniversity Campus is located next to Vinhomes Ocean Park - a 420-ha residential area newly established by Vingroup in Gia Lâm District of Hanoi. Aside from classrooms, the office area, library, and laboratories, the main VinUni campus is also equipped with a 1,500-seat auditorium, a sport complex with swimming pool and facilities for various sports. As a self-contained campus, VinUni Ocean Park Campus has separate dormitories for all freshmen, as well as for faculties, who will live and work alongside their students.

Organization
VinUni is organized into 3 colleges with 9 programs in total, including:

Notes and references

See also
 List of universities in Vietnam
 Education in Vietnam

External links

Universities in Hanoi
2020 establishments in Vietnam
Educational institutions established in 2020
Universities established in the 2020s
Vingroup